The Illini Prairie Conference is a high school athletic conference in the Illinois High School Association (IHSA), based in Central Illinois. The conference comprises ten medium-sized and small high schools resulting from the merging of the Corn Belt Conference and the Okaw Valley Conference. Conference athletics began in the 2017-18 school year.

History
Member schools of the Corn Belt Conference and the Okaw Valley Conference began discussing a merger after the announced departures of Eureka High School and Mahomet-Seymour High School from the Corn Belt Conference in 2014 and 2015. Principals of the ten schools voted unanimously in February 2016 to begin plans to merge the conferences. School boards of the ten schools approved the new conference in March and April 2016. Student bodies of each school submitted favorite names for the conference to the principals. Illini Prairie was selected unanimously by the principals.

Paxton-Buckley-Loda joined the conference at the start of the 2020-21 school year after, making the move after St. Thomas More decided to play an eight-man football schedule. PBL had played in the Sangamon Valley Conference since 1990. St. Thomas More remains a member of the Illini Prairie Conference in all other sports.

Olympia in 2021, left the Illini Praire Conference to join the Sangamo Confrence, Thus leaving the Illini Praire Conference with ten teams in the Conference and 9 of them that play football, still leaving St. Thomas-More an 8-man football team.

Member schools

See also
 List of Illinois High School Association member conferences

References

External links

Illinois high school sports conferences
Education in McLean County, Illinois
Education in Champaign County, Illinois
Education in Livingston County, Illinois